Novastrike is a downloadable game for the Sony PlayStation 3 video game console by American studio Tiki Games.

Gameplay
 Novastrike is a top-down shoot 'em up game. Gameplay is very simplistic; you must shoot everything you see, but with "next-gen" graphics and sound effects.

The player controls an experimental fighter called the Scythe, a hybrid of human and alien technology. The Scythe can pick up weapon parts and "mega packs" left from destroyed enemies to upgrade weapons.

External links
 Tiki Games

2008 video games
PlayStation 3 games
PlayStation 3-only games
PlayStation Network games
Shoot 'em ups

Video games developed in the United States